Shinee World 2012 (promoted as THE FIRST JAPAN ARENA TOUR "SHINee WORLD 2012") is the first Japan nationwide concert tour by South Korean boy group Shinee to support their first Japanese studio album, The First. The tour kicked off in Fukuoka on April 25, 2012, and ended in Hiroshima on July 1, 2012, with a total of 20 concerts in seven cities.

The tour attracted 200,000 concert-goers, setting a new attendance record for the first Japan tour of a Korean artist.

History
It was announced on December 24, 2011, that Shinee would embark on their first Japan nationwide concert tour, titled The First Japan Arena Tour "Shinee World 2012". It started on April 25, 2012, with a total of seven stops in Fukuoka, Sapporo, Nagoya, Osaka, Kobe, Tokyo and Hiroshima.

Due to the demand for tickets, it was announced on February 13, 2012, that six additional dates had been added to the line-up. This included one concert in Nagoya, three concerts in Osaka, and two concerts in Tokyo, for a total of 20 concerts. However, as even these dates sold out, additional seats with a restricted view of the stage were added. These also sold out on April 21 as soon as the tickets went on sale.

The tour attracted 200,000 people during its run. This marked the first time a Korean artist's first Japan arena concert tour had achieved these attendance figures, bringing in revenue of over 25 billion won (US$22 million). On July 28, 2012, Fuji TV broadcast the concert with live video and original interviews, and included a special version.

Setlist

Tour dates

DVD

Shinee The First Japan Arena Tour "Shinee World 2012" (promoted as SHINee THE FIRST JAPAN ARENA TOUR "SHINee WORLD 2012") is the third DVD and first Blu-ray by South Korean boy group Shinee. Following the announcement that Shinee would be releasing their sixth Japanese single titled "1000-nen, Zutto Soba ni Ite...' on December 12, 2012, it was also announced that they would be releasing a DVD/Blu-ray for their Shinee World 2012 tour on the same day.

The live DVD features their performance at Yoyogi National Gymnasium on June 23 and 24, 2012, from their first arena tour in Japan, Shinee World 2012. The limited edition includes a bonus movie featuring rehearsal and backstage footage. Set contains 2 live DVDs, a live photo book (100 pages), an original diary 2013, Shinee World 2012 replica bill set (5 pieces), and an original plastic sheet featuring member's solo shot randomly selected from 5 kinds. Features special packaging with a twin tray and a case. The regular edition contains 2 live DVDs, a live photo book (16 pages) in a tall case and documentary of Shinee World 2012 as special features. The live Blu-ray set contains 2 live Blu-ray discs, a live photo book (16 pages) in a BD case and also documentary of Shinee World 2012 as special features.

Track listing
DISC 1: 
 Opening  
 "Lucifer" (Japanese ver.) 
 "Amigo" (Japanese ver.) 
 "Juliette" (Japanese ver.) 
 "The Shinee World" (Japanese ver.) 
 MC-1  
 "Always Love"  
 "Hello" (Japanese ver.) 
 "Replay (Kimi wa Boku no Everything)"
 "Seesaw"  
 "Sherlock" (Japanese ver.) 
 "Love Like Oxygen" (Japanese ver.) 
 "Better" 
 "Amazing Grace" 
 "Y Si Fuera Ella"
 "Tie A yellow Ribbon Round The Ole Oak Tree"  
 "Start"
 "JoJo"
 "Stranger" (Japanese ver.)
 "Ready or Not"
 "Ring Ding Dong"  
 "To Your Heart"  
 "Lucifer" (Japanese ver.) (Only the high part of the song)
 Message from Shinee  
 "Kiss Kiss Kiss"

DISC 2: 
[Encore] 
 "Stand By Me" (Japanese ver.)
 "Bodyguard" (Japanese ver.)
 MC-2 
 "Keeping Love Again" 
 Finale

Chart performance

References

External links
SM Entertainment - Official website
EMI Music Japan - Official website
Shinee - Official South Korean website
Shinee - Official Japanese website

Shinee concert tours
2012 concert tours
SM Entertainment video albums
Albums recorded at the Yoyogi National Gymnasium

zh:Shinee World